Bataysk is a city in Rostov Oblast, Russia, located  southwest of Rostov-on-Don. Population:

History
It was founded in 1769, and was granted town status in 1938. The reconstructed Church of the Ascension was built between 1990 and 2006. The former Bataysk (air base) is located nearby.

Administrative and municipal status
Within the framework of administrative divisions, it is incorporated as Bataysk Urban Okrug—an administrative unit with the status equal to that of the districts. As a municipal division, this administrative unit also has urban okrug status.

Trivia
Bataysk has gained international attention since unveiling a "monument that shows a man's hand gripping a nubile female breast", which officials say "will bring family happiness to men who touch it".

Arts & Culture

Libraries
Maxim Gorky Central State Library
Nadezhda Krupskaya Central State *Children's Library
Mayakovsky Library 
Chekhov Library
Pushkin Library
Leo Tolstoy Library
Lermontov Library
Esenin Library
Nekrasov Library
Turgenev Library

Places of culture
MBUC "City center of culture and leisure"
MBUC "Bataysk History Museum"
Cinema "Illuzion"

Monuments
 There is a statue of Lenin on the central square
Train memorial - "to commemorate revolutionary, military and labour glory of Bataysk railway workers"
Memorial
Memorial
There is a stela with MiG-15 in the Aviators park.
Breast statue
Monument of the A.Pushkin and his wife N.Goncharova - placed on the Kirov street in 2013.
First World War memorial - placed on the Privokzalnaya sq. in 2014.
Sculpture "Bears" - opened in 2019 in the city park

The Bataysk City day celebrates on the last Sunday of September.

Notable citizens
Alexey Petrovich Maresyev

Sister city
 Sremski Karlovci, Serbia

References

Notes

Sources

External links
Official website of Bataysk  
Directory of organizations in Bataysk  

Cities and towns in Rostov Oblast
Don Host Oblast